This is a list of sister cities in the United States state of Arizona. Sister cities, known in Europe as town twins, are cities which partner with each other to promote human contact and cultural links, although this partnering is not limited to cities and often includes counties, regions, states and other sub-national entities.

Many Arizona jurisdictions work with foreign cities through Sister Cities International, an organization whose goal is to "promote peace through mutual respect, understanding, and cooperation."

C
Chandler
 Tullamore, Ireland

F
Flagstaff

 Barnaul, Russia
 Blue Mountains, Australia
 Manzanillo, Mexico
 Xindian (New Taipei), Taiwan

Fountain Hills

 Concepción de Ataco, El Salvador
 Dierdorf, Germany
 Kasterlee, Belgium
 Zamość, Poland

G
Gilbert

 Antrim and Newtownabbey, Northern Ireland, United Kingdom
 Leshan, China

Glendale

 Memmingen, Germany
 Ørland, Norway

M
Mesa

 Burnaby, Canada
 Caraz, Peru
 Guaymas, Mexico
 Kaiping, China
 Upper Hutt, New Zealand

P
Peoria
 Ards and North Down, Northern Ireland, United Kingdom

Phoenix

 Calgary, Canada
 Catania, Italy
 Chengdu, China
 Ennis, Ireland
 Grenoble, France
 Hermosillo, Mexico
 Himeji, Japan
 Prague, Czech Republic
 Ramat Gan, Israel
 Suwon, South Korea
 Taipei, Taiwan

Pinetop-Lakeside
 Spišské Podhradie, Slovakia

Prescott

 Caborca, Mexico
 Suchitoto, El Salvador
 Zeitz, Germany

S
Sahuarita
 Magdalena de Kino, Mexico

San Luis
 San Luis Río Colorado, Mexico

Scottsdale

 Álamos, Mexico
 Cairns, Australia
 Haikou, China
 Interlaken, Switzerland
 Killarney, Ireland
 Kingston, Canada
 Marrakech, Morocco
 Uasin Gishu, Kenya

Show Low
 Spišské Podhradie, Slovakia

Sierra Vista

 Cananea, Mexico
 Radebeul, Germany

T
Tempe

 Agra, India
 Beaulieu-sur-Mer, France
 Carlow, Ireland
 Cuenca, Ecuador
 Cusco, Peru
 Hutt, New Zealand
 Regensburg, Germany
 Skopje, North Macedonia
 Timbuktu, Mali
 Trollhättan, Sweden
 Zhenjiang, China

Tucson

 Ciudad Obregón, Mexico
 Guadalajara, Mexico
 Mazatlán, Mexico
 Pécs, Hungary
 Puerto Peñasco, Mexico
 County Roscommon, Ireland

Y
Yuma
 Frankfurt an der Oder, Germany

References

Arizona
Arizona geography-related lists
Populated places in Arizona
Cities in Arizona